Walter Charles Robinson (April 22, 1873 – July 13, 1942) was an American actor of the silent era.

Biography
Robinson was born on April 22, 1873 in Manhattan, New York City, to James H. Robinson and Emma Holzlander. He appeared in more than 170 films between 1910 and 1932. He died in Maywood, California on July 13, 1942.

Selected filmography

 A Flash of Light (1910, Short) - A Servant
 The Fugitive (1910, Short) - Confederate Soldier
 A Mohawk's Way (1910) as Indian
 His Trust (1911, Short)
 Fisher Folks (1911)
 The Lonedale Operator (1911, Short) - W.C. Robinson
 What Shall We Do with Our Old? (1911, Short) - In Shop (uncredited)
 The Lily of the Tenements (1911, Short) - The Butler
 Enoch Arden (1911, Short) - Rescuer
 The Indian Brothers (1911, Short) - In Second Tribe
 Her Awakening (1911, Short) - Accident Witness
 The Battle (1911, Short) - A Union Soldier (uncredited)
 The Miser's Heart (1911, Short) - Man In Front of Clothing Store
 The Old Bookkeeper (1912, Short) - A Policeman
 For His Son (1912, Short) - At Soda Fountain (uncredited)
 The Transformation of Mike (1912, Short) - In Bar / At Dance
 Under Burning Skies (1912, Short) - On Street
 The Goddess of Sagebrush Gulch (1912, Short) - A Cowboy (uncredited)
 Help! Help! (1912, Short) - Burglar
 Won by a Fish (1912, Short) - At Dinner
 One Is Business, the Other Crime (1912, Short) - Brickyard Worker (uncredited)
 The Lesser Evil (1912, Short) - In Smuggler Band
 An Outcast Among Outcasts (1912, Short) - A Tramp
 A Temporary Truce (1912, Short) - An Indian / In Bar / Among Rescuers (uncredited)
 A Change of Spirit (1912, Short) - Policeman (uncredited)
 Blind Love (1912, Short) - At the Social
 Two Daughters of Eve (1912, Short) - Backstage
 Friends (1912, Short) - Man in Saloon (uncredited)
 So Near, yet So Far (1912, Short) - In Club
 A Feud in the Kentucky Hills (1912, Short) - Second Clan Member
 The Chief's Blanket (1912, Short) - An Indian
 The Musketeers of Pig Alley (1912, Short) - Rival Gang Member
 Heredity (1912, Short) - Indian
 Gold and Glitter (1912, Short) - Lumberman (uncredited)
 My Baby (1912, Short) - At Table
 The Informer (1912, Short) - Union Soldier
 Brutality (1912, Short) - At Theatre
 The New York Hat (1912, Short) - In Shop (uncredited)
 My Hero (1912, Short) - Indian / Man in Room
 The Burglar's Dilemma (1912, Short) - Policeman
 The God Within (1912, Short) - In Bar
 Three Friends (1913, Short) - In Saloon (uncredited)
 The Tender Hearted Boy (1913, Short) - Man on Street (uncredited)
 Love in an Apartment Hotel (1913, Short) - Second Hotel Detective
 The Wrong Bottle (1913, Short) - In Road House (uncredited)
 The Unwelcome Guest (1913, Short) - At Auction (uncredited)
 A Misunderstood Boy (1913, Short) - Vigilante (uncredited)
 The Lady and the Mouse (1913, Short) - Creditor (uncredited)
 The House of Darkness (1913, Short) - Asylum Guard (uncredited)
 Almost a Wild Man (1913, Short) - In Audience (uncredited)
 The Mothering Heart (1913, Short) - Club Patron (uncredited)
 So Runs the Way (1913, Short) - The Butler
 Madonna of the Storm (1913, Short) - The Waiter
 The Battle at Elderbush Gulch (1913, Short) - Among the Indians
 Judith of Bethulia (1914) - Bethulian Soldier
 Strongheart (1914, Short) - Team Assistant
 Brute Force (1914, Short) - Valet (Prologue) / Tribesman (The Old Days)
 The Great Secret (1917, Serial)
 In Again, Out Again (1917) - The Trustee
 Thieves (1919) - Spike Robinson
 Daredevil Jack (1920) - Gang Member #1
 The Foolish Age (1921) - Todd
 Boston Blackie (1923) - Shorty McNutt
 The Fear Fighter (1925)
 City Lights (1931) - Man Who Throws Away Cigar (uncredited)
 Madison Square Garden (1932) - Writer W. C. Robinson
 The Bowery (1933) - Pug (uncredited)

References

External links

American male silent film actors
1873 births
1942 deaths
Male actors from California
Male actors from New York City
People from Maywood, California
20th-century American male actors